Salut les copains (meaning Hi friends in English) later changed to Salut! was a renowned French music variety magazine published between 1962 and 2006.

Launched by Frank Ténot and Daniel Filipacchi, as a supporting media to the very famous Europe 1 radio program Salut les copains, the magazine Salut les copains (literally "Hello, friends" in French) featured many of the top names of French music in the 1960s and 1970s, in addition to important coverage of American and British pop and rock acts. At its peak, its circulation exceeded one million copies per issue.

A huge concert was organized in Place de la Nation by the station Europe 1 on 22 June 1963, to celebrate the first anniversary of launching of the magazine Salut les copains, with 200,000 youth attending to hear Sylvie Vartan, Vic Laurens, Richard Anthony, Dick Rivers et les Chats sauvages, Danyel Gérard, les Gams, Nicole Paquin and Johnny Hallyday. After the event, the sociologue Edgar Morin in an article in the French daily Le Monde dubbed it the "yé-yé generation" giving rise to the French style of music known as "Yé-yé" that was applied to many popular acts in the 1960s.

The magazine's success prompted the launching of similarly titled German, Spanish and Italian editions of the magazine.

It also resulted in many youth-oriented French publications being launched including Âge Tendre, Bonjour les amis, Best, Extra and Nous les garçons et les filles.

As interest slackened in both the radio program and the Yé yé style of French music it supported, the magazine was renamed Salut! in January 1994 and licence sold to société Edi-Presse that turned it from a monthly to a bimonthly, with coverage including general interest article for youth, but including some music coverage. Faced with reduced readership, the magazine folded in April 2006.

References

1962 establishments in France
2006 disestablishments in France
Defunct magazines published in France
Bi-monthly magazines published in France
French-language magazines
Monthly magazines published in France
Music magazines published in France
Magazines established in 1962
Magazines disestablished in 2006